Erika Villaécija García (born 2 June 1984 in Barcelona, Spain), known as Erika Villaécija, is a three-time Olympic swimmer from Spain. She swam at the 2004, 2008 and 2012 Olympic team. And she has qualified for the 2016 Olympic team.

As of June 2009, she holds the Spanish Records in the long course 400, 800 and 1500 freestyles.

2012 Summer Olympics

Notes

References

External links
 
 
 
 

1984 births
Living people
Spanish female freestyle swimmers
Olympic swimmers of Spain
Swimmers at the 2004 Summer Olympics
Swimmers at the 2008 Summer Olympics
Swimmers at the 2012 Summer Olympics
Swimmers at the 2016 Summer Olympics
Medalists at the FINA World Swimming Championships (25 m)
European Aquatics Championships medalists in swimming
Mediterranean Games gold medalists for Spain
Mediterranean Games silver medalists for Spain
Mediterranean Games medalists in swimming
Swimmers at the 2001 Mediterranean Games
Swimmers at the 2005 Mediterranean Games
Swimmers from Barcelona